The 1816 Kentucky gubernatorial election was held on August 5, 1816.

Incumbent Democratic-Republican Governor Isaac Shelby was term-limited, and could not seek a second consecutive term.

Former state auditor of public accounts George Madison was elected unopposed.

Madison died on October 14, 1816, six weeks after taking office, and was succeeded by Lieutenant Governor Gabriel Slaughter.

General election

Candidates
George Madison, former state auditor of public accounts

Withdrawn
James Johnson, former member of the state senate

Results

References

1816
Kentucky
Gubernatorial